KK Livno (Košarkaški Klub Livno) is a basketball club based in Livno, Bosnia and Herzegovina.  KK Livno currently competes in the Herzeg-Bosnia League.

History
The club was founded in 2005 after their more notable predecessor, KK Troglav Livno, folded due to financial problems and debts.

References

External links
 Team profile at Eurobasket.com

Basketball teams in Bosnia and Herzegovina

Sport in Livno